The 2022 Big 12 Conference women's soccer tournament was the postseason women's soccer tournament for the Big 12 Conference held from October 30 to November 6, 2022. The 7-match tournament was held at the Round Rock Multipurpose Complex in Round Rock, Texas. The 8-team single-elimination tournament consisted of three rounds based on seeding from regular season conference play. The TCU Horned Frogs were the defending champions from 2021.

West Virginia won the title by defeating defending champion TCU 1–0 in the final. This was the fifth title in school history for West Virginia and head coach Nikki Izzo-Brown. As tournament champions, West Virginia earned the Big 12's automatic berth into the 2022 NCAA Division I Women's Soccer Tournament.

Seeding 

The top eight teams in regular season play qualified for the tournament.  There were two tiebreakers required in the seeding process.  The first tiebreaker was for the second and third seed as both TCU and Texas Tech finished with 5–1–3 regular season conference records.  The two teams played to a 0–0 draw on October 27, 2022, so the tiebreaker of conference goal difference was used.  TCU finished with a goal difference of +9 and Texas Tech had a goal difference of +6.  Therefore, TCU was the second seed and Texas Tech was the third seed.  Rivals Kansas and Kansas State finished tied for seventh place with 2–5–2 records after the regular season.  The two teams played to a 1–1 draw on October 21, 2022 so the conference goal difference tiebreaker was used again.  Kansas earned the seventh seed as they finished with a -3 goal difference, while Kansas State was the eighth seed, finishing with a -6 goal difference.

Bracket

Schedule

Quarterfinals

Semifinals

Final

Statistics

Goalscorers

All-Tournament team 
Source:

 * Offensive MVP
 ^ Defensive MVP

References 

 
Big 12 Conference Women's Soccer Tournament